Peetz is a Statutory Town in Logan County, Colorado, United States. The population was 238 at the 2010 census. Peetz is home to the RE-5 School District and Peetz K-12 School. It is also home to the Peetz Wind Farm. The area also contains Site Juliett which is an operational nuclear ICBM launch facility that was profiled on AirForceTV.

Geography

Peetz is located on the Peetz Plateau.

Commerce
Peetz's commerce mainly is focused on farming. In the town of Peetz, there is one restaurant/bar, the Hot Spot, a grain elevator and service station (Peetz Co-op), a telephone and internet provider (Peetz Telephone Company), and a laundromat.

Demographics

As of the census of 2000, there were 227 people, 90 households, and 63 families residing in the town. The population density was 4 people per square mile (461.3/km). The racial makeup of the town was 95.59% White, 1.76% from other races, and 2.64% from two or more races. Hispanic or Latino of any race were 10.57% of the population.

There were 90 households, out of which 31.1% had children under the age of 18 living with them, 54.4% were married couples living together, 8.9% had a female householder with no husband present, and 30.0% were non-families. 25.6% of all households were made up of individuals, and 10.0% had someone living alone who was 65 years of age or older. The average household size was 2.52 and the average family size was 3.06.

In the town, the population was spread out, with 30.4% under the age of 18, 4.8% from 18 to 24, 26.4% from 25 to 44, 18.5% from 45 to 64, and 19.8% who were 65 years of age or older. The median age was 37 years. For every 100 females, there were 108.3 males. For every 100 females age 18 and over, there were 102.6 males.

The median income for a household in the town was $42,083, and the median income for a family was $47,614. Males had a median income of $31,875 versus $21,667 for females. The per capita income for the town was $19,172. About 4.5% of families and 7.3% of the population were below the poverty line, including 15.2% of those under the age of eighteen and none of those 65 or over.

Name
The community was named after Peter Peetz, an early settler.

Transportation
There are no forms of public transportation in Peetz, but a BNSF Railway line runs past the town. Peetz lies next to Colorado State Highway 113.

See also

Outline of Colorado
Index of Colorado-related articles
State of Colorado
Colorado cities and towns
Colorado municipalities
Colorado counties
Logan County, Colorado
List of statistical areas in Colorado
Sterling, CO Micropolitan Statistical Area
Peetz Wind Farm

References

External links
Town of Peetz contacts
CDOT map of the Town of Peetz
Peetz Town Hall
Peetz K-12 School

Towns in Logan County, Colorado
Towns in Colorado